Yovan Nagwetch "Little Sun" is a Canadian songwriter, musician and activist living in Finland. He is the founder and main composer and arranger for the band, as well as lead vocals, flutes, and percussion.

Biography
Nagwetch "Little Sun" was born in the Gaspésie village of Chandler, Quebec and grew up in Mi'kmaq and Cree territories before moving to Montreal. He is of First Nations ancestry of the people of the Wabanaki, a hoop of small Native American nations located on the Atlantic shore of Canada and the United States. His father is a Métis activist. In the early 1970s, his family emigrated to Europe when he was a child.

Musical career
Nagwetch Little Sun composed his first song at the age of five, started song writing at the age of 13, learned to play guitar at 16, and has his first band at the age of 18 (the same time he learned to play the flute "by accident"). 

Though he has no formal education in music, he learned how to play the percussions from Henri Samba (drummer and dancer of the National Ballet of Congo), vocals from Klaus Blasquiz in the 1980s. Nagwetch's first musical project was called GWAM with which he toured France, Benelux, Germany, Switzerland, Spain, and Denmark. By the end of the 1980s, he returned to Canada to become a cultural producer in Montreal.

In the 1990s, Nagwetch Little Sun travels to Finland on tour and meets Esu Holopainen with whom he starts his main musical project Wabanag in 1999. It is a concept band blending traditional contents inspired by Nagwetch's Native American/Canadian Aboriginal background with blues-rock, a music style that has both Black and Red origins. However, he has also a whole French répertoire.

With Wabanag he has toured widely in Finland and surrounding countries. Until date, he has cut two LPs. Ulodi came out in 2004 and was nominated in the Best International Album category of the Canadian Aboriginal Music Awards winning the band recognition and airplay also in the USA and Canada. 

Bemia was released in 2013. In 2014 Nagwetch Little Sun collaborated with Jonne Järvelä on the latter's self-titled album, a side project from Järvelä's main band Korpiklaani, contributing vocals and work with flute and percussion. Nagwetch was also part of the  2017 follow-up album, Kallohonka.

Discography with Wabanag
2004: Ulodi
2013: Bemia

Personal life

Nagwetch Little Sun is also a known as a traditionalist and activist for the cause of Native and Métis peoples. Nagwetch Little Sun is the father of three girls.

References

External links
Wabanag Official website

Myspace
Canadian Aboriginal Music Awards
Facebook

Year of birth missing (living people)
Living people
People from Gaspésie–Îles-de-la-Madeleine
First Nations musicians
Canadian songwriters
Musicians from Quebec
Métis musicians